Herbert William Kerrigan (January 24, 1879 – September 10, 1959) was an American track and field athlete who competed mainly in the high jump.

Biography
He was born in Portland, Oregon and died in San Francisco.

Kerrigan competed for the Multnomah Athletic Club in Portland and won the Pacific Northwest high jump championships in 1894 and 1896. In the 1906 Intercalated Games held in Athens, Greece, Kerrigan won the bronze medal jointly with Greek athlete Themistoklis Diakidis. Kerrigan had been favored to win, but was injured by a wave that hit the ship carrying the U.S. team to Athens.

References

1879 births
1959 deaths
American male high jumpers
Athletes (track and field) at the 1906 Intercalated Games
Olympic bronze medalists for the United States in track and field
Track and field athletes from Oregon
Medalists at the 1906 Intercalated Games